The 1953 Tulsa Golden Hurricane football team represented the University of Tulsa during the 1953 college football season. In their first year under head coach Bernie Witucki, the Golden Hurricane compiled a 3–7 record, 1–3 against Missouri Valley Conference opponents, and finished in last place in the conference.

Schedule

References

Tulsa
Tulsa Golden Hurricane football seasons
Tulsa Golden Hurricane football